Chesapeake is an independent city in the Commonwealth of Virginia, United States. At the 2020 census, the population was 249,422, it is the second-most populous independent city in Virginia, tenth-largest in the Mid-Atlantic, and the 90th most populous city in the United States.

Chesapeake is included in the Virginia Beach–Norfolk–Newport News metropolitan area. One of the cities in the South Hampton Roads, Chesapeake was organized in 1963 by voter referendums approving the political consolidation of the city of South Norfolk with the remnants of the former Norfolk County, which dated to 1691. (Much of the territory of the county had been annexed by other cities.) Chesapeake is the second-largest city by land area in the Commonwealth of Virginia, and the 17th-largest in the United States.

Chesapeake is a diverse city in which a few urban areas are located; it also has many square miles of protected farmland, forests, and wetlands, including a substantial portion of the Great Dismal Swamp National Wildlife Refuge. Extending from the rural border with North Carolina to the harbor area of Hampton Roads adjacent to the cities of Norfolk, Portsmouth, Suffolk, and Virginia Beach, Chesapeake is located on the Atlantic Intracoastal Waterway. It has miles of waterfront industrial, commercial and residential property.

In 2011, Chesapeake was named the 21st best city in the United States by Bloomberg Businessweek. Chesapeake is home to the international Headquarters for Dollar Tree.

History

In 1963, the new independent city of Chesapeake was created when the former independent city of South Norfolk consolidated with Norfolk County. The consolidation was approved and the new name selected by the voters of each community by referendum, and authorized by the Virginia General Assembly.

Formed in 1691 in the Virginia Colony, Norfolk County had originally included essentially all the area which became the towns and later cities of Norfolk, Portsmouth, and South Norfolk. Its area was reduced after 1871 as these cities added territory through annexations. Becoming an independent city was a method for the former county to stabilize borders with neighbors, as cities could not annex territory from each other.

The relatively small city of South Norfolk had become an incorporated town within Norfolk County in 1919, and became an independent city in 1922. Its residents wanted to make a change to put their jurisdiction on a more equal footing in other aspects with the much larger cities of Norfolk and Portsmouth. In addition, by the late 1950s, although immune from annexation by the bigger cities, South Norfolk was close to losing all the county land adjoining it to the city of Norfolk in another annexation suit.

The consolidation that resulted in the city of Chesapeake was part of a wave of changes in the structure of local government in southeastern Virginia which took place between 1952 and 1975.

The Chesapeake region was among the first areas settled in the state's colonial era, when settlement started from the coast. Along Chesapeake's segment of the Intracoastal Waterway, where the Great Bridge locks marks the transition between the Southern Branch Elizabeth River and the Chesapeake and Albemarle Canal, lies the site of the Battle of Great Bridge. Fought on December 9, 1775, in the early days of the American Revolutionary War, the battle resulted in the removal of Lord Dunmore and all vestiges of English Government from the Colony and Dominion of Virginia.

Until the late 1980s and early 1990s, much of Chesapeake was either suburban or rural, serving as a bedroom community of the adjacent cities of Norfolk and Virginia Beach with residents commuting to these locations. Beginning in the late 1980s and accelerating in the 1990s, however, Chesapeake saw significant growth, attracting numerous and significant industries and businesses of its own. This explosive growth quickly led to strains on the municipal infrastructure, ranging from intrusion of saltwater into the city's water supply to congested roads and schools.

Chesapeake made national headlines in 2003 when, under a court-ordered change of venue, the community hosted the first trial of alleged Beltway sniper Lee Boyd Malvo for shootings in 2002. A jury convicted him of murder but spared him a potential death sentence; it chose a sentence of "life in prison without parole" for the young man, who was 17 years old at the time of the crime spree. A jury in neighboring Virginia Beach convicted his older partner John Allen Muhammad and sentenced him to death for another of the attacks.

On November 22, 2022, a mass shooting occurred in a Walmart off of Battlefield Boulevard in Chesapeake. Seven people were killed, including the gunman who committed suicide, and four others were injured.

Geography
Chesapeake is located at  (36.767398, -76.287405).

The northeastern part of the Great Dismal Swamp is located in Chesapeake.

Diverse environment
Chesapeake is one of the larger cities in Virginia and the nation in terms of land area. This poses challenges to city leaders in supporting infrastructure to serve this area. In addition, the city has many historically and geographically distinct communities. City leaders are faced with conflicts between development of residential, commercial and industrial areas and preservation of virgin forest and wetlands. Within the city limits in the southwestern section is a large portion of the Great Dismal Swamp.

Adjacent counties and cities
 Portsmouth, Virginia (north)
 Norfolk, Virginia (north)
 Virginia Beach, Virginia (east)
 Currituck County, North Carolina (south)
 Camden County, North Carolina (south)
 Suffolk, Virginia (west)

Communities
Chesapeake consists of six boroughs: South Norfolk, Butt Road, Deep Creek, Pleasant Grove, Western Branch and Washington. One of the boroughs, South Norfolk, used to be its own independent city and consolidated the surrounding portions of Norfolk County(extinct) into the City of Chesapeake.

Climate
The climate in this area is characterized by hot, humid summers and generally mild to cool winters. According to the Köppen Climate Classification system, Chesapeake has a humid subtropical climate, abbreviated "Cfa" on climate maps.

Demographics

2020 census

Note: the US Census treats Hispanic/Latino as an ethnic category. This table excludes Latinos from the racial categories and assigns them to a separate category. Hispanics/Latinos can be of any race.

2010 Census

As of the census of 2010, there were 222,209 people, 69,900 households, and 54,172 families residing in the city. The population density was 584.6 people per square mile (225.7/km2). There were 72,672 housing units at an average density of 213.3 per square mile (82.4/km2). The racial makeup of the city was 62.6% White, 29.8% Black or African American, 0.4% Native American, 2.9% Asian, 0.1% Pacific Islander, 1.2% from other races, and 3.0% from two or more races. 4.4% of the population were Hispanics or Latinos of any race. According to 2012 estimates 59.7% of the population is non-Hispanic white.

There were 69,900 households, out of which 41.0% had children under the age of 18 living with them, 59.7% were married couples living together, 14.0% had a female householder with no husband present, and 22.5% were non-families. 18.0% of all households were made up of individuals, and 5.9% had someone living alone who was 65 years of age or older. The average household size was 2.79 and the average family size was 3.17.

The age distribution was: 28.8% under the age of 18, 8.2% from 18 to 24, 32.3% from 25 to 44, 21.7% from 45 to 64, and 9.0% who were 65 years of age or older. The median age was 35 years. For every 100 females, there were 94.4 males. For every 100 females age 18 and over, there were 91.0 males.

The median income for a household in the city was $50,743, and the median income for a family was $56,302. Males had a median income of $39,204 versus $26,391 for females. The per capita income for the city was $20,949. About 6.1% of families and 7.3% of the population were below the poverty line, including 9.7% of those under age 18 and 9.0% of those age 65 or over.

Economy

Top employers
According to Chesapeake's 2020 Comprehensive Annual Financial Report and other sources (as indicated), the top employers in the city are:

Military
Chesapeake is home to two Navy bases:
 Northwest Annex, located in the Hickory area
 NALF Fentress

Points of interest
 Chesapeake Arboretum
 Chesapeake and Albemarle Canal
 Dismal Swamp Canal

Media
Chesapeake's daily newspaper is The Virginian-Pilot. Other papers include the Port Folio Weekly, the New Journal and Guide, and the Hampton Roads Business Journal. Hampton Roads Magazine serves as a bi-monthly regional magazine for Chesapeake and the Hampton Roads area. Hampton Roads Times serves as an online magazine for all the Hampton Roads cities and counties. Chesapeake is served by a variety of radio stations on the AM and FM dials, with towers located around the Hampton Roads area. Chesapeake is also served by several television stations. The Hampton Roads designated market area (DMA) is the 42nd largest in the U.S. with 712,790 homes (0.64% of the total U.S.). The major network television affiliates are WTKR-TV 3 (CBS), WAVY 10 (NBC), WVEC-TV 13 (ABC), WGNT 27 (CW), WTVZ 33 (MyNetworkTV), WVBT 43 (Fox), and WPXV 49 (ION Television). The Public Broadcasting Service station is WHRO-TV 15. Chesapeake residents also can receive independent stations, such as WSKY broadcasting on channel 4 from the Outer Banks of North Carolina and WGBS-LD broadcasting on channel 11 from Hampton. Chesapeake is served by Cox Communications which provides LNC 5, a local 24-hour cable news television network.

Infrastructure

Transportation

Toll road
Tolls in Chesapeake are currently limited to the Chesapeake Expressway, Veterans Bridge and the Jordan Bridge, but new ones may be imposed on some existing facilities to help generate revenue for transportation projects in the region.

Airports
Chesapeake is served by the nearby Norfolk International Airport in the City of Norfolk with commercial airline passenger service.

Within the city limits, Chesapeake Regional Airport is a general aviation facility located just south of Great Bridge. Also within the city, is the Hampton Roads Executive Airport located near Bowers Hill and the Hampton Roads Beltway. This airport caters to private airplane owners and enthusiasts. East of Great Bridge, NALF Fentress is a facility of the U.S. Navy and is an auxiliary landing field which is part of the large facility at NAS Oceana in neighboring Virginia Beach.

River and ports
The Intracoastal Waterway passes through Chesapeake. Chesapeake also has extensive frontage and port facilities on the navigable portions of the Western and Southern Branches of the Elizabeth River.

The Dismal Swamp Canal runs through Chesapeake as well. The site of this canal was surveyed by George Washington, among others, and is known as "Washington's Ditch". It is the oldest continuously used man made canal in the United States today and has been in service for over 230 years. The canal begins in the Deep Creek section of the city branching off from the Southern Branch of the Elizabeth River. The canal runs through Chesapeake paralleling U.S. Highway 17 into North Carolina and connects to Elizabeth City, North Carolina.

Rail
Five railroads currently pass through portions of Chesapeake, and handle some intermodal traffic at port facilities on Hampton Roads and navigable portions of several of its tributary rivers. The two major Class 1 railroads are CSX Transportation and Norfolk Southern, joined by three short line railroads.

Chesapeake is located on a potential line for high speed passenger rail service between Richmond and South Hampton Roads which is being studied by the Virginia Department of Rail and Public Transportation. A new suburban passenger station near Bowers Hill would potentially be included to supplement a terminal in downtown Norfolk.

Highways
 
 
Chesapeake is served by U.S. Highways 13, 17, 58, and 460. Interstate 64, part of the Hampton Roads Beltway, crosses through the city, Interstate 464 is a spur which connects it with downtown Norfolk and Portsmouth at the Berkley Bridge, and Interstate 664, which completes the Interstate loop from the Western Branch section of Chesapeake through the city of Newport News and into the city of Hampton.

State Route 168 is also a major highway in the area. It includes the Chesapeake Expressway toll road.

Chesapeake is the only locality in the Hampton Roads area with a separate bridge division. The city's Department of Public Works, Bridges and Structures division has 51 full-time workers. The city maintains 90 bridges and overpasses. Included are five movable span (draw) bridges which open an estimated 30,000 times a year for water vessels.

Bus
Hampton Roads Transit buses serve the city of Chesapeake as well as other cities in the Hampton Roads Area.

Utilities
Water and sewer services are provided by the city's Department of Utilities. Chesapeake receives its electricity from Dominion Virginia Power which has local sources including the Chesapeake Energy Center (a coal-fired and gas power plant), coal-fired plants in the city and Southampton County, and the Surry Nuclear Power Plant. Norfolk headquartered Virginia Natural Gas, a subsidiary of AGL Resources, distributes natural gas to the city from storage plants in James City County and in the city.

The Virginia tidewater area has grown faster than the local freshwater supply. Chesapeake receives the majority of its water from the Northwest River in the southeastern part of the city. To deal with intermittent high salt content, Chesapeake implemented an advanced reverse osmosis system at its Northwest River water treatment plant in the late 1990s. The river water has always been salty, and the fresh groundwater is no longer available in most areas. Much of its follows the former right-of-way of an abandoned portion of the Virginian Railway. It is capable of pumping  of water per day. The cities of Chesapeake and Virginia Beach are partners in the project.

The city provides wastewater services for residents and transports wastewater to the regional Hampton Roads Sanitation District treatment plants.

Education
Chesapeake City Public Schools is the local school district.

The Chesapeake Public Library System includes seven branches and one lending kiosk. After getting a library card, resources can be checked out online or in person at any of the branches. Additionally, Interlibrary Loan requests can be made in person or online if a resource you want is available at a different branch. 

The Chesapeake Public Library offers a variety of educational, career, and literary services to community members. A core part of the mission of the Chesapeake Public Library is to “support learners at every level to succeed in their education and career paths”. This mission is accomplished in many ways, including free online classes for children and adults, access to a wide variety of digital educational resources, career help events, and creative/artistic programming.

Notable people

 Eddie Butler, professional baseball player
 Clarence Clemons, musician
 Michael Cuddyer, professional baseball player
 Kenny Easley, member of NFL Hall of Fame
 Randy Forbes, former U.S. Representative
 DeAngelo Hall, professional football player
 Percy Harvin, professional football player
 Frank Hassell (born 1988), basketball player
 Grant Holloway, 110 m hurdle world champion
 Patrick Jones II, professional football player
 Ashton Lewis Jr. NASCAR driver
 Mizkif, Twitch streamer
 Alonzo Mourning, professional basketball player
 Omos, former college basketball player, professional wrestler for WWE
 Darren Perry, professional NFL football player and NFL professional coach
  Jay Pharoah, comedian
 Chris Richardson, singer
 Ricky Rudd, NASCAR driver
 Mike Scott, professional basketball player
 Don Shipley, retired Navy Seal and YouTube star
 Scott Sizemore, professional baseball player
 Ben Smith, 2015 CrossFit games champion 
 Cam Thomas, professional basketball player
 Darryl Tapp, professional football player
 Justin Upton, professional baseball player
 Melvin Upton Jr., professional baseball player
 Brianté Weber (born 1992), basketball player in the Israeli Basketball Premier League
 David Wright, professional baseball player

In popular culture
In 2015, in honor of the game's 80th birthday, Hasbro held an online vote in order to determine which cities would make it into an updated version of the Monopoly Here and Now: The US Edition of the game. Chesapeake, Virginia won the wildcard round, earning it a brown spot.

Politics
Chesapeake is a national bellwether, voting with the winner of the electoral college in every presidential election since 1972, except in 1992 and 1996. 
Controversial anti-abortion activist Donald Spitz currently lives in Chesapeake.

See also

 Club Lake Ahoy
 Chesapeake Tribe
 Laurel Avenue Church of Christ
 List of famous people from Hampton Roads
 National Register of Historic Places listings in Chesapeake, Virginia

References

External links

 Chesapeake Conventions and Tourism
 City of Chesapeake
 Chesapeake Public Schools
 Chesapeake Economic Development - serving Chesapeake Businesses

 
1963 establishments in Virginia
Populated places established in 1963
Cities in Virginia
Populated places in Hampton Roads